Mateus Solano Schenker Carneiro da Cunha (born 20 March 1981) is a Brazilian actor.

He is best known for his performances in Brazilian telenovelas, television series and films. After his debut in Brazilian entertainment industry, Solano has featured in more than a dozen of telenovelas. In telenovelas, he is known for his roles in Viver a Vida, Gabriela, Amor à Vida, among others. He has received several accolades as well as nominations such as Melhores do Ano, Nickelodeon Kids' Choice Awards (Brazilian version), Troféu Imprensa, among others. In 2013, he played the role of Félix Khoury in the critically acclaimed telenovela Amor à Vida.

Biography
Mateus was born in Brasilia, capital of Brazil. By early adolescence, he was already working in small services. Seeking his personal independence and investing in his acting career, he moved to Washington, D.C. alone and then to Lisbon, Portugal. After some time, he returned to live with his mother in Rio de Janeiro. He holds a degree in Performing Arts from the Federal University of the State of Rio de Janeiro.

He is the cousin of the Brazilian actresses Juliana Carneiro da Cunha and Gabriela Carneiro da Cunha.

Career
Solano's career began in 2003 at the age of 22 where he appeared in one of the episodes of Linha Direta. In 2004, he co-starred in Um Só Coração, a television miniseries where he played Gustavo Gomes. In 2005, he appeared in Glória Perez's series A Diarista. In 2007, Solano made a special appearance in Paraíso Tropical. In 2009, he played twins; Miguel and Jorge in Viver a Vida. The telenovela starred Taís Araújo, José Mayer, Alinne Moraes, Barbara Paz, Lilía Cabral. In 2012, he played as one of the leading roles in Gabriela, portraying Mundinho Falcão. In 2013, he, played the leading man for a conniving, evil and resentful Félix Khoury in Amor à Vida. The telenovela earned him several accolades due to his great performance in it. In 2016, he is set to star in Liberdade, Liberdade playing José Maria Rubião.

Personal life
In 2008, he married actress Paula Braun. On October 18, 2010, the couple's first daughter, Flora, was born. On May 1, 2015, the couple's second child, Benjamin, was born.

Filmography

Film

Television

Awards and nominations

References

External links

1981 births
Living people
Male actors from Brasília
Brazilian male telenovela actors
Brazilian male television actors
Brazilian male film actors
Jewish Brazilian male actors